Subor Culture Development Co., Ltd. is a Chinese electronics company. Its headquarters are in Xiqu Subdistrict, Zhongshan, Guangdong.

Subor was known for making a clone of the Famicom (Nintendo Entertainment System), known as the Subor Video Game System, a.k.a. Xiǎo Bàwáng. As some parents were loath to buy devices for purely recreational reasons, the device was called educational. Jackie Chan became a spokesperson for the company.

The console was popular in the 1980s and 1990s. It was impacted by a ban on console games from 2000 to 2015. The company later specialized in other electronic products such as dictionaries but later debuted a new video game system, the Subor Z+, in 2018. It also invested money into virtual reality devices. Karen Chiu stated in 2019 that Chinese people who played video games as children had nostalgia for the Subor Video Game System comparable to such in Western countries for the actual consoles.

The company went bankrupt in 2020 as per the Zhongshan Intermediate People's Court, and authorities barred Feng Baolun, the legal representative of the company, from commerce deemed "high consumption" including commercial air travel and staying in a hotel deemed to be upscale due to Feng being labeled a "discredited" person.

References

External links
  
Electronics companies of China